Gilead is an unincorporated community in Perry Township, Miami County, in the U.S. state of Indiana.

History
Gilead was platted about 1840 by Adam E. Rhodes who had settled there in 1835. It was probably named after Gilead, in the Hebrew Bible.

Economy
Gilead supports four stores: The Gilead General Store, Squirrel Creek Bulk Foods, Rabers Kountry Store LLC, and Interurban Collectibles.

References

Unincorporated communities in Miami County, Indiana
Unincorporated communities in Indiana